Clemente Alessio Picariello (born 27 August 1993) is a Belgian racing driver. His father is Italian.

In 2001, he participated in his first race. In 2002, Alessio participate in all championship races but given the quality of his material, his father decides to invest in a professional equipment. For his first season, he finished 10th in the championship CFO.
In 2003, he finished third in the championship of the French Community and the first championship of Hainaut.
2004 a year of success. Alessio won everything and was also crowned best Belgian hope.
Triple Belgian champion, fourth at the European finals.

Picariello won the 2013 ADAC Formel Masters scoring 388 points, 148 more than second-placed Maximilian Günther.

Racing Record

Career Summary

‡ Team standings.

Complete 24 Hours of Le Mans results

Complete WeatherTech SportsCar Championship results
(key) (Races in bold indicate pole position; results in italics indicate fastest lap)

References

External links 

 
 

1993 births
Living people
Sportspeople from Charleroi
Belgian racing drivers
Formula Renault 2.0 NEC drivers
ADAC Formel Masters drivers
Formula Renault Eurocup drivers
MRF Challenge Formula 2000 Championship drivers
Asian Le Mans Series drivers
Formula Masters China drivers
ADAC GT Masters drivers
Super GT drivers
FIA World Endurance Championship drivers
European Le Mans Series drivers
24 Hours of Le Mans drivers
WeatherTech SportsCar Championship drivers
Mücke Motorsport drivers
Phoenix Racing drivers
W Racing Team drivers
Mercedes-AMG Motorsport drivers
Audi Sport drivers
Nürburgring 24 Hours drivers
GT4 European Series drivers
Craft-Bamboo Racing drivers
Iron Lynx drivers